Joseph Alston (1779–1816) was Governor of South Carolina.

Joseph Alston may also refer to:

Joseph Cameron Alston (1926–2008), American badminton player
Sir Joseph Alston, 1st Baronet (died 1688), of the Alston baronets
Sir Joseph Alston, 2nd Baronet (c. 1640–1689), High Sheriff of Buckinghamshire,  of the Alston baronets
Sir Joseph Alston, 3rd Baronet (c. 1665–1716), High Sheriff of Buckinghamshire, of the Alston baronets
Sir Joseph Alston, 4th Baronet (1691–1718), of the Alston baronets